Frank Taberski (1889–1941) was a professional pocket billiards player from Schenectady, New York. Nicknamed "The Gray Fox," he won 14 world titles.

Biography
Taberski was born in 1889, and first made a living by selling milk door to door. He began practicing pool at 13 years of age, playing 30 minutes a day when his working hours were over. 

In 1915, at age 26, he turned pro after attending the New York City pocket billiards championship.

In 1916 he became world champion by defeating Johnny Layton.

Also in 1916 he retained his title by defeating Ralph Greenleaf.

In 1917 he retained his title again by defeating James Maturo.

By 1918 he had won 10 consecutive challenge matches. Following those victories, Taberski temporarily retired that same year.

He returned to pocket billiards in 1925 and regained the world title from Greenleaf who held it over 10 challenge matches in a row.

His highest straight pool run is 238.

Taberski died in 1941. He was 52.

His son Harold Taberski was also a pool player.

Taberski was inducted into the Billiard Congress of America Hall of Fame in 1975.

Titles & achievements
 1916 World Straight Pool Championship
 1916 World Straight Pool Championship
 1916 World Straight Pool Championship
 1917 World Straight Pool Championship
 1917 World Straight Pool Championship
 1917 World Straight Pool Championship
 1917 World Straight Pool Championship
 1917 World Straight Pool Championship
 1917 World Straight Pool Championship
 1918 World Straight Pool Championship
 1921 14.1 Record High Run. 200 Consecutive Balls
 1925 National Straight Pool Championship
 1927 NBAA World Straight Pool Championship
 1927 NBAA World Straight Pool Championship
 1928 NBAA World Straight Pool Championship
 1928 NBAA World Straight Pool Championship
 1975 Billiard Congress of America Hall of Fame

References

American pool players
World champions in pool
1889 births
1941 deaths
Sportspeople from Schenectady, New York
American people of Polish descent